Alexander Peter Allain (June 27, 1920 – January 5, 1994) was a lawyer and library advocate known for his work securing the freedom of expression. His career was devoted to securing First Amendment rights for libraries.

Allain is recognized as one of American Libraries' “100 of the Most Important Leaders we had in the 20th Century” for being “a true visionary” in his battle to uphold the First Amendment; his work with the American Library Association (ALA) included helping with the creation of the Office for Intellectual Freedom in 1967 and cofounding the Freedom to Read Foundation.

Early life 
Born in Louisiana, as a young man, Allain served as a liaison officer in the French Navy during World War II, stationed in Casablanca.  After serving time in the navy, he received his law degree from Loyola University New Orleans in 1942.  In 1953, Allain was appointed to the St. Mary Parish Library Board of Control in Louisiana. It was during this time that the United States feared communism and scrutinized libraries for harboring any information that could potentially influence the public opinion. This was an influential time in Allain’s life as he went on to make intellectual freedom cases his life’s work.

The Louisiana Library Association 
Allain was very involved in the Louisiana Library Association (LLA) as well as the ALA. In 1964, he was the first chair of the Louisiana Library Association Intellectual Freedom Committee, and he continued to stay active in the state association throughout his life. He was instrumental in the formation of the Council of Louisiana Trustees (COLT), which worked to organize library trustee activity in Louisiana. He also served in numerous other capacities such as chair and vice-chair of the LLA Trustees Section.

The Freedom to Read Foundation and the American Library Association 
One of Allain’s biggest contributions to fight for intellectual freedom within libraries was the work he did with ALA’s Office of Intellectual Freedom to co-found the Freedom to Read Foundation (FTRF) in 1969. 

The FTRF was set up in conjunction with the ALA’s office of Intellectual Freedom instead of as a separate entity because of the work ALA was already doing to protect the First Amendment and intellectual freedom. When the Foundation was being planned for and organized, Allain expressed concern in a letter to the Director of the Intellectual Freedom Office, Judith Krug, that ALA members would forget what the ALA has done and continues to do for intellectual freedom by covering themselves in this new umbrella of aid and assistance in the FTRF. Allain felt that there should be overlap of both organizations so that the focus remained centered on intellectual freedom and could be worked on in harmony.

Allain also felt that in forming the FTRF with the ALA, the Foundation would be able to benefit from some of the clout and connections that ALA already had. He also suggested keeping policies between the two organizations similar because of his belief in the good work that the ALA does; he was continuously concerned about the ALA in his creation of the foundation and did not want members to see the foundation as a replacement but rather an addition to.

Other works, achievements and involvements 
Library trustees, along with intellectual freedom, were another area of Allain’s interest and expertise. Some of his publications in this area include, “Trustees & Censorship,” The Library Trustee: a Practical Guidebook, 1964; “Public Library Governing Bodies & Intellectual Freedom”, Library Trends, July 1970; and “The First & Fourteenth Amendment as They Support Libraries, Librarians, Library Systems & Library Development”, Illinois Libraries, January 1974.

According to an article in memory of Allain in Louisiana Libraries, he won many awards including: LLA’s Modisette Award for Trustees (1965), ALA’s Trustee Award (1969), the University of Illinois’ Robert B. Downs Award (1973), ALA Honorary Life Membership (1975), the John Phillip Immroth Memorial Award (1979), the Freedom to Read Foundation Roll of Honor Award (1989 and 1999), the Southeastern Library Association President’s Award (1990) and the LLA Intellectual Freedom Award (1991). The Franklin branch of the St. Mary Parish Library in Louisiana is named in Allain's memory.

Outside of his professional life, Allain was an avid volunteer in the community. He was a member of Rotary International, Knights of Columbus, Scouting and his Chamber of Commerce.

Notes 

1920 births
1994 deaths
People from Louisiana
American librarians
Loyola University New Orleans College of Law alumni
French Navy personnel of World War II
20th-century American lawyers
American librarianship and human rights
French Navy officers
American expatriates in Morocco